Foulger is a surname. Notable people with the surname include:

Byron Foulger (1899–1970), American actor
Gillian Foulger (born 1952), British geologist and academic
John Foulger (1942–2007), English painter
Keith Foulger (1925–2021), British naval architect
Peter Foulger, also Peter Folger (1617–1690), Nantucket settler, teacher, poet

See also
Folger